JDS Asashio (SS-562) was the lead boat of thes. She was commissioned on 13 October 1966.

Construction and career
Hayashio was laid down at Kawasaki Heavy Industries Kobe Shipyard on 6 June 1960 and launched on 31 July 1961. She was commissioned on 30 June 1962, into the 2nd Submarine Group of the 1st Submarine Group.

On 11 August 1967, she made contact with a portion of her hull with the seabed while training in the Tsushima area, damaging a portion of her sonar.

On 16 March 1968, she was transferred to the 3rd Submarine under the 1st Submarine Group, and she was incorporated with JDS Harushio. She participated in Hawaii dispatch training from July 20 to October 8 of the same year.

On 16 October 1973, the 3rd Submarine was reorganized into the 2nd Submarine Group, which was newly formed under the Self-Defense Fleet.

At around 9:30 pm on 31 March 1978, she came into contact with JDS Natsugumo while training at Enshu-nada, about 120 km south of Omaezaki, Shizuoka Prefecture. The periscope of Asashio and the right shaft of Natsugumo were partially damaged. At that time, anti-submarine attack training aimed at Asashio was underway in this water area, and Asashio came into contact with Natsugumo at a periscope depth of about 16 meters.

She was decommissioned on 30 March 1983. She had 2,330 dives, 21,674 hours and 14 minutes underwater, 8,066 hours and 58 minutes surfaced, and a total nautical mile of 201,243.4 nautical miles.

Citations

External links

1965 ships
Asashio-class submarines
Ships built by Kawasaki Heavy Industries